Santiago María García de la Rasilla Domínguez (18 October 1936 – 13 August 2018) was a Spanish-born Peruvian Roman Catholic bishop. García de la Rasilla Domínguez was born in Spain and was ordained to the priesthood in Spain for the Society of Jesus. He served as titular bishop of Voncaria. From 2006 to 2014, he served as bishop of the Apostolic Vicariate of Jaén in Peru in Peru.

Notes

1936 births
2018 deaths
People from Madrid
21st-century Roman Catholic bishops in Peru
Spanish Roman Catholic bishops in South America
Roman Catholic bishops of Jaén in Peru